Suran Subdistrict  is a nahiyah (subdistrict) located in Hama District in the Hama Governorate, northwestern Syria.

According to the Syria Central Bureau of Statistics (CBS), Suran Subdistrict had a population of 90.654 people in the 2004 census.

References 

Suran
Hama District